This is a list of the highest paved roads in Switzerland. This height approximately corresponds to that of the highest major settlements in the country. Some of the listed roads are closed to motorised vehicles, although they are normally all accessible to pedestrians and cyclists. These mountain roads are popular with drivers, bikers and cyclists for their spectacular scenery and are often the highlights of bicycle races such as Tour de Suisse and Tour de Romandie. Many of them are also served by public transport, the main transport company being PostBus Switzerland.

As the tree line lies at approximately 2,000 metres in the Alps, almost all the upper sections of the listed roads are in the alpine zone, where the main form of precipitation becomes snow. Most of these roads are closed in winter, although important road links such as the Simplon remain open through the year.

This list does not include any motorway as the three highest motorways (San Bernardino Tunnel, Gotthard Road Tunnel and Vue des Alpes Tunnel) are below 1,700 metres. For a list including only road passes, see list of highest road passes in Switzerland.

List

See also

Transport in Switzerland
List of mountain railways in Switzerland (highest railways in Switzerland)
List of highest road passes in Switzerland
Gobba di Rollin - highest location in Switzerland and Europe reached by 4x4 vehicles
List of highest paved roads in Europe

References

Swisstopo topographic maps (1:25,000)
Quäldich.de (German)

Lists of tourist attractions in Switzerland